Heiser Ridge is a narrow rock ridge,  long, midway between the West Prongs and Hudson Ridge in the Neptune Range of the Pensacola Mountains in Antarctica. It was mapped by the United States Geological Survey from surveys and U.S. Navy air photos, 1956–66, and was named by the Advisory Committee on Antarctic Names for James R. Heiser, a topographic engineer with the Neptune Range field party, summer 1963–64.

References

Ridges of Queen Elizabeth Land